Rhotic is a term in linguistics which may refer to:

 Rhotic consonant, liquid consonants such as the  sound in red
 R-colored vowel,  a vowel that is modified in a way that lowers the third formant, such as the  sound in Midwestern American English pronunciation of fur
 Erhua, a phonological process that adds R-coloring in some varieties of Mandarin Chinese

See also
 Rhotacism
 Rhoticity in English, English accents that keep  or lose it in some cases